Jordi Cornet (29 December 1965 – 19 March 2021) was a Spanish politician and businessman.

Biography
Cornet held a degree in business sciences from the University of Barcelona. In 1986, he became a member of the People's Party, which he represented while serving on the City Council of Barcelona from 1995 to 2010. He then served in the Parliament of Catalonia from 2010 to 2012, during which he served as First Secretary.

Jordi Cornet died of cancer on 19 March 2021 at the age of 55.

References

1965 births
2021 deaths
Deaths from cancer in Spain
Politicians from Barcelona
People's Party (Spain) politicians